Xylopia ferruginea is a species of plant in the family Annonaceae. It is a medium-sized forest tree which can reach  in height.

The word ferruginea is derived from the Latin word "ferrugo" ("rust"), and refers to the rusty colored hairs on the underside of the leaves.

In the Malay language, the common name is "Jangkang", which literally means "stilt roots".

References

The Wayside Trees of Malaya, EJH Corner, 4th Edition, 1998

ferruginea
Taxa named by Joseph Dalton Hooker
Taxa named by Thomas Thomson (botanist)
Taxa named by Henri Ernest Baillon